Metal Slug 1st Mission was released in 1999 and 2000 in Japan and North America respectively by SNK for the Neo Geo Pocket Color. The game was developed by Ukiyotei.

The game was released as part of the NEOGEO POCKET COLOR SELECTION Vol. 1 bundle for Nintendo Switch and Steam.

Gameplay
Metal Slug 1st Mission plays similarly to other Metal Slug games, but has toned down graphics for the Neo Geo Pocket Color hardware. Notably, grenades are thrown by pressing the option button to switch, then fire. This was changed in the sequel. When the game is completed once, another character becomes playable. There are five different difficulty levels: kids, easy, normal, hard, and very hard.

References

External links

1999 video games
Metal Slug
Neo Geo Pocket Color games
SNK games
Ukiyotei games
Video games scored by Yasuaki Fujita
Video games developed in Japan